The World Mixed Teams Championship is a bridge competition for teams of mixed pairs. At every table, two teams are always represented by a mixed pair, one man and one woman.

The Mixed Teams event was held in conjunction with the first and fourth World Pair Olympiads in 1962 and 1974. (Other World Pair Olympiads included a Mixed Pairs event.) One Mixed Teams event was conducted in a Team Olympiad year, 1972.

It was revived in 1996 as World Transnational Mixed Teams Championship. The revived event has been held every leap year as a secondary component of the World Team Olympiad and its successor meet, the World Mind Sports Games.

With the Olympiad, the Mixed Teams has started after the latter's qualifying stage has been concluded. Teams that failed to qualify in the main event as well as new teams may enter. Each team must comprise at least two men and two women. The maximum number of team members is six. During play each pair must consist of one woman and one man. It is not necessary that all team members be from the same country – hence the transnational. A series of Swiss matches leads to the qualification of the top four teams for knockout semifinals and finals.

The World Mixed Swiss Teams is another world championship series for mixed teams, now conducted in non-leap even years as part of the World Bridge Series. Both now permit transnational entries. The difference is between KO and Swiss format. The leap years event is a knockout for 16 teams that survive preliminary play while is a Swiss. (All teams play several short matches every day throughout the contest, never facing the any team for a second time.)

Results

* Hermannsson did not play enough boards in order to qualify for the title of World Champion

2012
At the second World Mind Sports Games, August 2012, the Mixed Teams began with a 3-day Swiss tournament from which eight teams qualified for three one-day knockout matches (48 deals each). The qualifying matches were played during the quarterfinal and semifinal matches between national teams in the main events (Bridge at the 2012 World Mind Sports Games). Following those quarterfinals, and 10 qualifying matches played by 83 mixed teams, four new teams joined the latter event with a score that placed them in a tie for 12th place.

Defending champion YEH Bros returned in name, reached the medal round, and finished fourth. Captain Chen Yeh and Juei-Yu Shih, both from Chinese Taipei, were joined by two players from China and two from Japan.

The silver medalists from Canada included a mother and son.

See also
 Bridge at the 2008 World Mind Sports Games
 Bridge at the 2012 World Mind Sports Games

Notes

References

External links
 World Championship Events tabular overview at the World Bridge Federation

Mixed Teams
Contract bridge mixed pairs